Headline Publishing Group is a British publishing brand and former company. It was founded in 1986 by Tim Hely Hutchinson. In 1993, Headline bought Hodder & Stoughton and the company became Hodder Headline Ltd. In 1999, Hodder Headline was acquired by WH Smith. It was acquired by Hachette Livre, from the WHSmith Group PLC, in 2005.

References

External links

.
Publishing companies of the United Kingdom
Publishing companies of England
Publishing companies based in London
British companies established in 1986
Publishing companies established in 1986
1986 establishments in England
Lagardère Media